Auguste Sérieyx (14 June 1865 – 19 February 1949) was a French music pedagogue, musicographer and composer.

Biography 
Born in Amiens, Auguste Sérieyx, musicographer and composer studied at the Conservatoire de Paris with André Gedalge and subsequently at the Schola Cantorum de Paris with Charles Bordes, Paul Dukas and Vincent d'Indy where he latter taught music composition (1900–1914). As early as 1883, he wrote in his diary: "Music holds an increasingly important place in my preoccupations". In particular, he discovered Tchaïkovsky, Liszt and Saint-Saëns. In 1905, he married pianist Jeanne Taravant, a sought-after performer of the musicians of his time, in particular the piano music of Debussy. It was she who contributed to the introduction of Sérieyx into the Parisian musical life of the time. In the same year, Sérieyx undertook a trip to Switzerland. He visited Bulle, Montreux, the Abbey of St. Maurice, Agaunum and he attended the fête des vignerons in the company of Albert Roussel.

Installed in Montreux since 1914, Auguste Sérieyx taught at the Institut Ribaupierre. Sérieyx also held the position of maître de chapelle at the Villeneuve church. He collaborated with Vincent d'Indy on his monumental Cours de composition. On 11 June 1920, his wife died, and he dedicated his Cours de grammaire musicale to her, which was published five years later. In 1931, on 26 July, Auguste Sérieyx married Marie-Louise Bouët. Like her husband, Marie-Louise has devoted her entire life to teaching musical language.

Very attached to the Catholic faith, Sérieyx devoted the deepest of his inspiration to religious music. He signed a collection of 24 motets on texts from The Imitation of Christ, masses, organ pieces and a mystery play for soli, choir and orchestra. Sereyx left music of piano and some pages of chamber music including a sonata for violin and piano. Author of several melodies for vocals and piano, he paid great attention to the choice of his lyrics. Among the writers and poets he put to music were Alexandre Duman, Victor Hugo, Édouard Guinand,  and Jean Richepin, not to mention personal translations of Latin texts. In November 1972, the Music Department of the Cantonal and University Library of Lausanne enriched its collections of music archives with the work of composer, professor and theorist Auguste Sérieyx.

Auguste Sérieyx died in Lausanne on 19 February 1949.

Selected publications 
1910: Les Trois états de la tonalité, Paris
1925: Cours de grammaire musical, Paris
1946: Monteverdi et Franck, Geneva

Sources 
  Auguste Sérieyx (1865-1949)

References

External links 
 Auguste Sérieyx on IdRef
 Auguste Sérieyx on Musicalics
 Lettres à Auguste Sérieyx on WorldCat
 Inventaire du fonds musical, Auguste Sérieyx on WorldCat
 Sérieyx, Auguste on IMSLP

French Romantic composers
French male classical composers
Conservatoire de Paris alumni
Schola Cantorum de Paris alumni
French music educators
19th-century French musicologists
20th-century French musicologists
1865 births
People from Amiens
1949 deaths
Writers about music
20th-century French male musicians
19th-century French male musicians